

The previous SS Rotterdam 
In early 1906 the Holland-Amerika Lijn (HAL) sold her steamship Rotterdam III to the Danish Det Forenede Dampskibsselskab, who renamed her C.F. Tietgen. The SS Rotterdam from 1908 was the fourth Rotterdam by that name of the HAL. She is often referred to as Rotterdam IV, but this designation was rarely used at the time.

Ordering and construction 
Before 1906 the HAL had ships that were no larger than 12,500 tons. The HAL then decided on a strategy to use bigger ships. In February 1906 the HAL received the New Amsterdam of 17,200 tons built by Harland and Wolff.  By July 1906 it was known that the HAL had ordered a new Rotterdam of 23,000 tons at Harland and Wolff. It was to be delivered in Spring 1908. By January 1907 it was known that she would be named Rotterdam.

The launch of the Rotterdam was planned for 22 February 1908. By 1 o'clock in the afternoon about 5,000 guests of Harland and Wolff had assembled for the event, and thousands of other spectators had assembled on the shores. At the moment supreme the director of the yard had to announce that the launch had become impossible because two other ships had not been removed to a save location. On the 23rd a second attempt was cancelled because the two ships could not be removed because of a storm. A third attempt failed because the grease on the slipway had been pushed aside. On 3 March 1908 the Rotterdam was finally launched. On 3 June 1908 the Rotterdam made her trial run and reached a speed of 18 knots. After that she sailed to Southampton in order to be inspected in the dry dock over there.

Characteristics

Dimensions and hull 
The Rotterdam measured 666 by 77 by 56 (depth of hold) English feet. Given as length 203 m, beam 23.47 m and depth 17 m in the metric system. The tonnage was 24,170 tons. The displacement was 36,870 tons at 35 feet draught. The hull was divided in watertight compartments by thirteen transverse bulkheads and one bulkhead along the center line of the ship. The bottom of the hull was double. She did have bilge keels

Engines 
The engines of the Rotterdam were two separate quadruple expansion engines generating 14,000 ihp. Steam was provided by two single and eight double boilers heated by 54 fires. The designed speed was 16.5 knots. The quadruple expansion was realized by cylinders of 33, 47, 68 and 97.5 inch diameter with a 60-inch stroke.

Accommodation  
The Rotterdam could transport 3,440 passengers. 525 first class, 515 second class, and 2,400 third class passengers.

The first class passengers had the most facilities. Their big dining room measured 28 m by 23 m and could seat about 500 persons. Its floor was covered in rubber. The social hall measured 16 by 12 m and was finished with dark Spanish Mahogany. It had a piano and an organ. The large lobby was finished in cream lacquered wood and had wide stairs with wrought iron gilded ornamentation and a copper handrail. It led to a palm garden of 14 by 12 m, which was finished in cream lacquered wood in Louis XVI style. Its sides contained Delftware tile tableaux. In the center a large cupola with stained glass windows shed light on the garden and stairs. The library measured 10.5 by 12 m and was decorated Louis XVI style in Italian juglans wood. The upper and lower smoking lounges measured 18 by 13.5 m and 9 by 13.5 m. There were 265 first class cabins. There were 48 single person luxury cabins, and 12 suites with their own saloon. The number of first class bathrooms was about 100. The wide stairs gave access to the first class promenade decks. There was an upper and lower promenade decks as well as a boat deck, totaling 28,255 square feet. A novelty of the Rotterdam was that parts of the promenade decks had glass covers that could be brought up against the sea spray. At the time a unique feature of liners crossing the Atlantic.

For the second class passengers there was also a dining room. It was also finished in lacquered wood, seated 300 persons and measured 14 by 23 m. On the higher decks there was a saloon for ladies and a smoking saloon finished in oak. The second class promenade decks measured 12,000 square feet. There were 158 second class cabins. Many for two persons, but also for four persons.

The 2,400 third class passengers had two dining rooms measuring 6,230 square feet in total. Not that much smaller than the first class dining room. However, it had place for only 581 persons, so the third class passengers had to eat in shifts. Third class cabins were also for two or four persons, and got clean bedding each trip. Spacious lobbies with seats led upstairs where the third class had 11,000 square feet of promenade deck.

Crew  
The Rotterdam had a crew of 472 people. 51 served on deck, 119 on the machines, and 302 in 'civilian service'. The purser (chef-hofmeester) had an assistant-purser as well as 5 stewards (hofmeesters). There were 126 waiters first class, 55 waiters second class, and 31 waiters third class. There were 15 maids for the linen, and 44 cooks. Their work was made a bit lighter by three electrical dishwashers, one with a capacity of 4,000 an hour, and two with a capacity of 400 pieces an hour. There were also machines for skinning potatoes and polishing knives.

Service  

On 13 June 1908 SS Rotterdam started her maiden trip from Rotterdam to New York. This was only a few weeks after her trials at Belfast in early June. On board were only 75 first class passengers, 82 second class, and 128 third class passengers. On 1 July she left New York again, with 288 passengers first class, 356 second class passengers and 298 third class passengers. 1908 was not a good year for the American economy, and that explains why the passenger numbers picked up slowly. However, by 1910 the Rotterdam regularly transported more than a thousand migrants on each trip.

Even before World War I the HAL started to develop a cruise industry. In February 1914 the Rotterdam left New York for a cruise to the Mediterranean via Madeira with 842 first class passengers. It would make a round trip of the Mediterranean, visiting Cadiz, Gibraltar, Algiers, Athene, Istanbul, Jaffa, Alexandria, Naples, Villefranche-sur-Mer, and Boulogne.

World War I
During the first years of World War I the Rotterdam transported many of the 45,000 American civilians that got stuck in Germany or Switzerland back to the United States. In September 1914 the Rotterdam steamed from New York and was arrested and brought to Plymouth on 22 September. Here it had to  unload the copper it carried. However, the 1,500 tons of copper loaded in New York could not be unloaded from the lower decks because the harbor of Southampton was closed. Therefore, the British government bought the copper and the Rotterdam was released on 6 October. The copper would then be unloaded in Rotterdam and stored there on behalf of the British government. On 12 October 1914 the Rotterdam arrived in Rotterdam carrying 8,000 25 kg sacks of flour. On 16 October she left for New York again, carrying almost 2,000 passengers. She then made another trip from Rotterdam to New York, and made two trips between Italy and New York.

After most Americans had left Europe, and because migration had come to a standstill, the number of passengers became insufficient to make a profit. This was more than compensated by the cargo situation. Exports from the Netherlands had first declined, but then began to grow. For cargo to the Netherlands, the situation was even better. There was so much cargo that the HAL had to hire ships to transport it. In 1915 the Rotterdam sailed a regular schedule  between Rotterdam and New York. Often less than a hundred boarded in New York, and about 500 in Rotterdam. On 29 August 1915 a fire was discovered on board. It was extinguished by pumping sulfur gas into the compartment. On arrival in Rotterdam on 2 September this proved not to be the case, and the fire was extinguished with water. The fire probably started in the cotton cargo. Of the 201 sacks of mail stored above, 7 were burnt and the rest was heavily damaged by the water. In the first years of the war the Rotterdam also regularly transported gold to the Netherlands. In late 1915 the Rotterdam had 25,500 balen coffee (sacks of 60 kg) on board.

On 23 March 1916 the Rotterdam arrived in Rotterdam. Her cargo of mail had been seized in England, and she carried the crew of the sunk Palembang. HAL then decided to lay up the Rotterdam. The official reason was that if she was lost, she could not be replaced for many years because Dutch shipyards were not able to build a ship of the size of the Rotterdam. Rotterdam sat out the unrestricted submarine warfare, that started on 1 February 1917 safely in port.

Post World War I

Back in service 
After World War I had finished, the Rotterdam first had to go to Glasgow to dock, as there was no suitable drydock in the Netherlands. On 24 January the Rotterdam left the Rotterdam for New York with less than 100 passengers, but in Brest she picked up many American soldiers. These trips with American soldiers continued for some months, and gradually the regular service from New York to Rotterdam was restored.

In April 1921 the Rotterdam was the first ship to officially use the 46,000 tons drydock at Wilton's Dok- en Werf Maatschappij in Schiedam.

Cruise ship 
In the 1920s the Rotterdam regularly made a cruise from New York to the Mediterranean. E.g. in 1923, in February–March 1924. and in 1925. In 1929 she was renovated. The three passenger classes were replaced by two. The capacity changed to 517 first class and 1,130 tourist class passengers. A decline in capacity of almost 50% from the 3,139 she could carry previously. Also in the early thirties, her hull was painted white.

In 1935 the Rotterdam hit a reef near the Morant Cays south of Jamaica. She was pulled loose, and repaired at Wilton-Fijenoord. The Rotterdam made cruises to the North Cape in 1935, 1936, 1937 and 1938. In 1937 and 1938 she also made a long cruise to South America.

Broken up 

In 1939 the Rotterdam was laid up in Rotterdam. By then she had sailed a distance of 70 times the circumference of the earth. In 1940 she was broken up.

The next HAL ship named Rotterdam was the  SS Rotterdam V that still exists as a museum ship and hotel in Rotterdam.

References

Notes

External links

RMS Rotterdam IV (1908-1940) video
SS Rotterdam IV Interior Images
The six HAL ships named Rotterdam
Description and some pics of the Rotterdam IV, with excerpts from the itinerary brochure

Ships of the Holland America Line
1908 ships